LCS may refer to:

Schools and organizations 
 Laboratory for Computer Science, research institute at the Massachusetts Institute of Technology
 Lake County Schools school district of Lake County, Florida
 Lakefield College School an independent school in Lakefield, Ontario, Canada
 Larchmont Charter School, a public charter school in Los Angeles, California
 Lebanese Community School in Lagos, Nigeria
 Legal Complaints Service, a former body that formally investigated complaints about solicitors in the United Kingdom
 Lincoln Christian College and Seminary
 Lincoln Community School in Accra, Ghana
 Littlehampton Community School, large secondary school in West Sussex, England
 Littleover Community School in Derby, England
 Lockerby Composite School Canadian Secondary School in Ontario
 London Controlling Section, a British World War II secret organisation
 London Co-operative Society, a former consumer co-operative society of the United Kingdom
 London Corresponding Society, a radical British society founded in 1792
 Louisville Collegiate School, a private, nonsectarian, college preparatory k-12 school in Louisville, Kentucky.
 Lutheran Confessional Synod, type of church
 Lynden Christian Schools

Science, mathematics, and computing 
 Laser Camera System, a type of scanner used on the Space Shuttle
 Lagrangian coherent structure, in fluid mechanics, a type of flow structure
 Learning classifier system, machine learning system
 Lincoln Calibration Sphere 1, first of a series of inert globes used as radar calibration satellites
 Liquid cooling system
 Live Communications Server
 Live Communications Server 2003
 Live Communications Server 2005
 Locally convex space
 Longest common substring problem in computer science, the longest shared sequence of consecutive characters
 Longest common subsequence problem in computer science, the longest shared sequence of not necessarily consecutive characters

Sports and entertainment 
 Grand Theft Auto: Liberty City Stories, a game for the PlayStation Portable and PlayStation 2
 Last Comic Standing, an NBC reality program that premiered in 2003
 League Championship Series, a round of playoffs in Major League Baseball
 League Championship Series (formerly League of Legends Championship Series), the North American professional esports league for the MOBA PC-game League of Legends, based in Los Angeles and organized by Riot Games
 Liberal Crime Squad, an ASCII based game
 Loose Cannon Studios, an American video game company

Other uses 
 Landing Craft Support, amphibious landing support ship, from World War II
 LCS, a psychology credential for "Licensed Clinical Social Worker".  See List of credentials in psychology
 Littoral combat ship, a type of warship used by the United States

See also 

 
 LC (disambiguation)